A folk dance is a dance that reflects the life of the people of a certain country or region. Not all ethnic dances are folk dances. For example, ritual dances or dances of ritual origin are not considered to be folk dances. Ritual dances are usually called "Religious dances" because of their purpose.
The terms "ethnic" and "traditional" are used when it is required to emphasize the cultural roots of the dance. In this sense, nearly all folk dances are ethnic ones. If some dances, such as polka, cross ethnic boundaries and even cross the boundary between "folk" and "ballroom dance", ethnic differences are often considerable enough to mention.

Background

Folk dances share some or all of the following attributes:

Dances are usually held at folk dance gatherings or social functions by people with little or no professional training, often to traditional music.
Dances not generally designed for public performance or the stage, though they may later be arranged and set for stage performances.
Execution dominated by an inherited tradition from various international cultures rather than innovation (though folk traditions change over time).
New dancers often learn informally by observing others or receiving help from others.
More controversially, some people define folk dancing as dancing for which there is no governing body or dancing for which there are no competitive or professional institutions. The term "folk dance" is sometimes applied to dances of historical importance in European culture and history; typically originating before the 20th century. For other cultures the terms "ethnic dance" or "traditional dance" are sometimes used, although the latter terms may encompass ceremonial dances.

There are a number of modern dances, such as hip hop dance, that evolve spontaneously, but the term "folk dance" is generally not applied to them, and the terms "street dance" or "vernacular dance" are used instead. The term "folk dance" is reserved for dances which are to a significant degree bound by tradition and originated in the times when the distinction existed between the dances of "common folk" and the dances of the modern ballroom dances originated from folk ones.

Europe

Varieties of European folk dances include:

Ball de bastons
Barn dance
Bulgarian dances
Pravo horo
Paidushko horo
Gankino horo
Daychovo horo
Circle dance
Clogging
Dutch crossing
English country dance
Fandango
Flamenco 
Freilekhs
Georgian dance
Greek dances
Hora
International folk dance
 Irish dance
 Ceili dance
 Italian folk dance
Tarantella
Calabrian Tarantella
Pizzica
Monferrina
Ballu tundu
Jenkka
Jota
Maypole dance
Morris dance
Welsh Morris dance
Polka
Polish folk dances
Polonaise
Oberek
Krakowiak
Mazurka
Kujawiak
Russian folk dance
Turkish dance
Ukrainian dance
Verbuňk
Nordic polska dance
Square dance
Sword dance
Weapon dance
Kolo

Sword dances include long sword dances and rapper dancing. Some choreographed dances such as contra dance, Scottish highland dance, Scottish country dance, and modern western square dance, are called folk dances, though this is not true in the strictest sense. Country dance overlaps with contemporary folk dance and ballroom dance. Most country dances and ballroom dances originated from folk dances, with gradual refinement over the years.

People familiar with folk dancing can often determine what country a dance is from even if they have not seen that particular dance before. Some countries' dances have features that are unique to that country, although neighboring countries sometimes have similar features.  For example, the German and Austrian schuhplattling dance consists of slapping the body and shoes in a fixed pattern, a feature that few other countries' dances have.

Folk dances sometimes evolved long before current political boundaries, so that certain dances are shared by several countries.  For example, some Serbian, Bulgarian, and Croatian dances share the same or similar dances, and sometimes even use the same name and music for those dances.

International folk dance groups exist in cities and college campuses in many countries, in which dancers learn folk dances from many cultures for recreation.

Balfolk events are social dance events with live music in Western and Central Europe, originating in the folk revival of the 1970s and becoming more popular since about 2000, where popular European partner dances from the end of the 19th century such as the schottische, polka, mazurka and waltz are danced, with additionally other European folk dances, mainly from France, but also from Sweden, Spain and other countries.

Middle East, Central Asia and South Asia

 Ardah
 Armenian dance
 Assyrian folk dance
 Azerbaijani dances
 Bihu, an Assamese dance celebrating the arrival of spring, traditionally the beginning of the Assamese New Year
 Attan - The national dance of Afghanistan. Also a popular folk dance of Pashtuns tribes of Pakistan including the unique styles of Quetta and Waziristan in Pakistan.
 Bhangra, a Punjabi harvest dance in Pakistan and India and music style that has become popular worldwide.
 Chitrali Dance - Chitral, Khyber-Pakhtunkhwa in Pakistan.
 Circassian dance
 Circle dance
 Dabke, a folk dance of the Levant
 Domkach, folk dance of Bihar and Jharkhand, India
 Garba  Circular Devotional dance from Gujarat danced the world over 
 Israeli folk dance
 Kalbelia is one of the most sensuous dance forms of Rajasthan, performed by the kalbelia tribe
 Khattak Dance - Khyber-Pakhtunkhwa in Pakistan.
 Khigga, a common folk dance among Assyrian people
 Kurdish dance
 Luri dances
 Lewa (folk dance) - Baluch folk dance in Pakistan.
 Chaap (traditional Baloch folk dance in Pakistan)
various dances such as tamang selo and many others
 Thabal chongba
 Kyushtdepdi - The national dance of Turkmenistan

India

East and Southeast Asia

China

Yangge

Cambodia

Romvong
Rom kbach
Robam Neary Chea Chuor
Peacock Dance
Chhayam
Cambodian Coconut Dance
Cambodian Fish Dance
Trot Dance

Indonesia

Japan

Bon dance
Buyō, typical dance of the Japanese geishas or dance artists
Rimse (Ainu people)
Kachāshī (Okinawa)

Korea

Nongak

Malaysia

Zapin

Nepal

Tamang Selo dance
Chhokara
Khyali
Maruni
Deuda
Chaulo
Dhan Nach
Madikhole
Phagu (dance)
Sorathi
Sakela (Chandi)
Singaru
Tarbare
Bajrayogini dance
Charitra
Jat-jatin
Charya
Hanuman dance

Philippines

Balse Marikina
Benjan
Binasuan
Cariñosa
Itik-itik
Kalesa
Kuntao Silat Amil Bangsa
Kuntaw
Kuratsa
La Jota Moncadena
Lerion
Magkasuyo
Maglalatik
Pagdiwata
Pandanggo
Pangalay
Paraguanen
Pista
Sagayan
Sayaw sa Bangko
Singkil
Subli
Tiklos
Tinikling

Taiwan
Bamboo dance (Amis people)

South America

Argentina 
Chacarera
Bailecito
Zamba
Gato
Cueca
Chamamé
Malambo

Peru 
Marinera

Venezuela 
Gaita Zuliana

Africa

Angola 

 Kizomba

Cameroon 

 Ambasse bey

 Assiko
 Bikutsi

Ghana 

 Adowa
 Agbadza
 Agbekor (Atamga)

 Kpanlogo
 Bobobo
 Alkayida

Niger 

 Bitti Harey

North America

Mexico 
Baile Folklorico (Mexico and Central America)
Contradance
Square Dance

Oceania
 Hula (Hawaii)
 Haka (New Zealand)

Gallery

See also
 List of ethnic, regional, and folk dances sorted by origin
 International folk dance
 Dance basic topics, a list of general dance topics
 Balfolk, contemporary folk dance practised across Europe
 Elizabeth Burchinal, authority on American folk dance

References

External links

Folk Dance Hawaii

Dancilla 
Folklore People Community
Folk Dance
Folklore Festivals
Folklore Festivals
Society for International Folk Dancing

 
Social dance